Radstädter Tauern Pass (el. 1,738 m or 5,702 ft) is a high mountain pass in the Austrian state of Salzburg, connecting the town of Radstadt in the Pongau region with Mauterndorf in Lungau.

Geography

The pass separates the Radstadt Tauern in the west and the Schladming Tauern in the east, both part of the Niedere Tauern mountain range in the Central Eastern Alps. It is crossed by the Katschberg Straße (B 99) road, which runs from Bischofshofen on the Salzach River via Radtstadt in the Enns Valley to Sankt Michael im Lungau on the Mur River. From Sankt Michael it leads further southwards across the Katschberg Pass to Spittal an der Drau in Carinthia. A little to the west and about 600 m lower, the parallel Tauern Autobahn (A 10) crosses the Radstadt Tauern in the Tauern Road Tunnel.

The road probably was already used by the Celtic Taurisci tribe. It was rebuilt as a Roman road during the rule of Emperor Septimius Severus from 193 onwards, leading from Iuvavum (Salzburg) in the Noricum province across the main chain of the Alps to Aquileia in Italy.

At the pass is the Obertauern ski resort.

See also
 List of highest paved roads in Europe
 List of mountain passes

External links 

 Profile on climbbybike.com

Mountain passes of Salzburg (state)
Mountain passes of the Alps
Radstadt Tauern
Schladming Tauern